Cara de Dios is an EP by the Chilean band La Ley.  La Ley performed a new song, "En La Ciudad", at a live TV concert, which set the expectations for the release of a new album.  Because fans were expecting an album featuring the song, PolyGram decided to release "Cara de Dios", which remains an album searched for by the fans, similar to the albums Desiertos, Doble Opuesto, and La Ley. Two singles were released from the album, for which no music videos were produced and this is the final album with band founder and guitarist Andrés Bobe.

Track listing 

"En la Ciudad" (Cara de Díos) - (Bobe, Cuevas, Clavería, Rojas) – 4:22
"Desiertos" (Mix) - (Bobe, Delgado, Aboitiz) – 6:42
"A Veces" - (Bobe, Arbulu) – 5:18
"Rhythm Valentine" - (Bobe, Cuevas) – 3:54

Personnel

La Ley

Andrés Bobe – guitar
Mauricio Clavería – drums
Alberto "Beto" Cuevas – vocals
Luciano Rojas – bass

Others

Ramon Villanueva – producer
Hernan Rojas – recording engineer
Oscar Lopez - recording engineer & mixing engineer 
Walter Gonzalez – recording engineer
Humberto Gatica – mix

External links 
Official site

1994 EPs
La Ley (band) albums